Uskoci is a village near Stara Gradiška, Croatia, population 100 (census 2011).

References

Populated places in Brod-Posavina County